Koutný (feminine Koutná) is a Czech surname. Notable people with the surname include:

 Bedřich Koutný (born 1931), Czech boxer
 Jan Koutný, Czech gymnast
 Lajos Koutny, Hungarian ice hockey player
 Václav Koutný, Czech footballer

Czech-language surnames